The sixth season of the long-running Australian medical drama All Saints began airing on 11 February 2003 and concluded on 25 November 2003 with a total of 43 episodes.

Plot 
Bron and Ben's big day has arrived and despite his nerves and the unwelcome arrival of her father, they finally make it to the altar. Their beautiful wedding is the first of many for All Saints staff in 2003, a year of love, loss, and new beginnings. In blossoming relationships, Regina gets a date with the florist of her dreams and Matt falls for a patient, unaware of what is wrong with her. Luke tries endlessly to impress Paula's young son Max however it seems he can do no right. 

Mitch's erratic behavior and increasing deafness bring him and a worried Terri to loggerheads until Mitch undergoes tests uncovering that his recent symptoms are the sign of something far worse than either of them had imagines. Special requests are being made of the doctors at All Saints, and their response will change lives and lead to explosive conflict on Ward 17. Tragically, as Christmas approaches an obsessive gunman embarks on a shooting spree stalking through the hospital. The year brings teary farewells for two of All Saints' much loved and long serving staff as Bron and Mitch say goodbye forever.

Cast 
All cast correct to the opening credit block

Main cast 
 Georgie Parker as Terri Sullivan
 Jenni Baird as Paula Morgan
 Natasha Beaumont as Rebecca Green (episodes 1–24)
 Conrad Coleby as Scott Zinenko (37 episodes)
 Christopher Gabardi as Vincent Hughes (episodes 12–43)
 Fletcher Humphrys as Alex Kearns (36 episodes, from episode 7)
 Celia Ireland as Regina Butcher
 Martin Lynes as Luke Forlano
 Tammy MacIntosh as Charlotte Beaumont
 Judith McGrath as Von Ryan
 Rachel McNamara as Frances Regan (25 episodes, from episodes 17 to 42)
 Henry Nixon as Sterling McCormack (episodes 10–43)
 Josh Quong Tart as Matt Horner (23 episodes, until episode 35)
 Libby Tanner as Bronwyn Markham (8 episodes, until episode 10)
 Ben Tari as Jared Levine (23 episodes, until episode 24)
 Paul Tassone as Nelson Curtis
 Erik Thomson as Mitch Stevens (episodes 1–10)
 Brian Vriends as Ben Markham (episodes 1–7)

Special Guest cast 
 Angela Punch McGregor as Carmen Shaw (6 episodes)
 Victoria Langley as Margaret O'Brien (2 episodes)
 Brett Climo as Dr. Malcolm Pussle (2 episodes)
 Robert Coleby as Prof. Richard Craig (1 episode)

Recurring cast 
 Rochelle Whyte as Cara Windom (18 episodes)
 David Downer as Colin Blackburn (13 episodes)
 Alan Flower as Morris the Florist (12 episodes)
 Genevieve O'Reilly as Leanne Curtis (10 episodes)
 Jack Rickard as Max Morgan (10 episodes)
 Penne Hackforth-Jones as Nicola Hartley (8 episodes)
 Nick Flint as Angus Drummond (7 episodes)
 Brett Stiller as Greg Roberts (7 episodes)
 Rachael Coopes as Kirsten Sutton (6 episodes)
 John Noble as Alan Madsen (6 episodes)
 Anne Looby as Julia Archer (5 episodes)
 Kate Sheil as Victoria Carlton (5 episodes)
 Emma Coppin as Lucy Stevens (5 episodes)
 Bill Tomkins as Jeff Carson (5 episodes)
 Joy Smithers as Rose Stevens (4 episodes)
 Jessica Gower as Harriet Stapleton (4 episodes) 
 Lisa Flanagan as Chloe Hanson (4 episodes)
 Kim Hillas as Joan Marden (4 episodes)
 Victoria Thaine as Sasha Netterfield (3 episodes)
 Drayton Morley as Fred Netterfield (3 episodes)
 Rohan Nichol as Aaron Collingwood (3 episodes)
 Olivia Brown as Kendra Blackburn (3 episodes)
 Diane Richards as Vera Fleming (3 episodes)
 Melanie DeFerranti as Madeline Fleming (3 episodes)

Guest cast 
 Travis Chapman as Charlie Green (3 episodes)
 Helmut Bakaitis as Sal Forlano (3 episodes)
 Sam O’Dell as Wayne Dunstan (3 episodes)
 Robyn Forsythe as Collette Pullman (2 episodes)
 Bevan Wilson as Prof. Walter Thomas (2 episodes)
 Patrick Thompson as Paul Stevens (2 episodes)
 Bartholomew John as Lindsay Green (2 episodes)
 Anne Grigg as Sonia Green (2 episodes)
 Beth Weston as Maureen Smith (2 episodes)
 Barry Quin as Dr Simon Byrne (2 episodes)
 Maggie Dence as June Markham (2 episodes)
 Troy Planet as Denis Pool (2 episodes)
 Liz Alexander as Dr. Alison Newell (2 episodes)
 Abigail Bianca as Miranda Maloney (2 episodes)
 Amelia Longhurst as Kerry Randle (2 episodes)
 Kathryn Hartman as Sue Everett (2 episodes)
 Rohan Mack as Tom Everett (2 episodes)
 Jack O’Shea as Brock Everett (2 episodes)
 Christopher Pitman as Rick Forlano (1 episode)
 Eliza Logan as Danielle Markham (1 episode)
 Margie McRae as Catherine Craig (1 episode)
 Terence Crawford as John O'Brien (1 episode)
 Bronte Doherty as Cassie O'Brien (1 episode)
 Melissa Jaffer as Eileen Sullivan (1 episode)
 Penny Pedersen as Glinda Moss (1 Episode)

Episodes

DVD release

References

General
 Zuk, T. All Saints Series 6 episode guide, Australian Television Information Archive. Retrieved 15 July 2008.
 TV.com editors. All Saints Episode Guide - Season 6, TV.com. Retrieved 15 July 2008.

Specific

All Saints (TV series) seasons
2003 Australian television seasons